Universal Credit Rating Group (UCRG) is a credit ratings agency based in Hong Kong. Plans to create UCRG were announced in October 2012, and it was officially founded in Hong Kong in June 2013, as a partnership between Dagong Global Credit, Egan-Jones Ratings, and RusRating. In 2014, it described itself as the only international credit rating agency based in the Asia Pacific area.

Advisory Council 
On 23June 2014, UCRG announced its 2015-20 operating plan along with the formation of an advisory council to the group chaired by former French Prime Minister Dominique de Villepin. The other initial members are former Australian Prime Minister Kevin Rudd, former Pakistan Prime Minister Shaukat Aziz and former Russian Foreign Minister Igor Ivanov

References

External links
Website

Financial services companies established in 2013
Credit rating agencies
Financial services companies of Hong Kong